Corinthians FC SA was an amateur soccer club based in San Antonio, Texas. The team made its debut in the National Premier Soccer League in 2014. The club played in the South Central Conference of the South Region. Corinthians FC of SA was led by Pete Veras and head coach, co-owner, and technical director, Benjamin Galindo. Founded in 2009, Corinthians FC of SA was dedicated to serving the communities in and around the San Antonio area.

History 
2014

Corinthians FC won its first ever NPSL game on May 17, 2014 - a 4-2 away win over the Liverpool Warriors. They would finish their inaugural season with a 7-0-3 record, finishing 1st in the South Division and 3rd overall in the South Central Conference regular season table. In the playoffs, Corinthians made it to the South Central Conference Championship game where they lost to Tulsa Athletics, 4-2.

2016

On January 16, 2016, Benjamin Galindo was appointed the new head coach of Corinthians FC. Galindo is a former player on the Mexico national team and Chivas Guadalajara coach. The club made its first appearance in the Lamar Hunt U.S. Open Cup during the 2016 tournament. The team was selected as an "At-Large Berth" on February 5, 2016.

2017

Corinthians FC did not participate in the 2017 NPSL season as the team ceased operations.

Lamar Hunt U.S. Open Cup

Stadium 
The team played at Alamo Stadium in San Antonio, Texas. Alamo Stadium is owned and operated by the San Antonio Independent School District and seats 23,000.

Year-by-year

Honors

Domestic League
National Premier Soccer League
South Region - South Central Conference
Runner-Up: 2014, 2015

Notes

References

External links
Official team site

Association football clubs established in 2009
Association football clubs disestablished in 2017
National Premier Soccer League teams
Soccer clubs in Texas
2009 establishments in Texas
2017 disestablishments in Texas